The Treasury-class cutter was a group of seven high endurance cutters launched by the United States Coast Guard between 1936 and 1937. The class were called the "Treasury class" because they were each named for former Secretaries of the Treasury. These ships were also collectively known as the "327's" as they were all  in length.  The Treasury-class cutters proved versatile and long-lived warships. Most served the United States for over 40 years, including with distinction through World War II, Korea, and Vietnam.

In the words of naval historian John M. Waters, Jr., they were their nation's "maritime workhorses. The 327s battled through the 'Bloody Winter' of 1942–43 in the North Atlantic," with the ships fighting off and destroying German U-boats, and rescuing survivors from torpedoed convoy ships. Roles of the 327s included serving as amphibious task force flagships in World War II, pilot search and rescue (SAR) during the Korean War, and a critical component of Operation Market Time during the Vietnam War. "Most recently, these ships-that-wouldn't-die have done duty in fisheries patrol and drug interdiction. Built for only $2.5 million each, in terms of cost effectiveness we may never see the likes of these cutters again."

Design and construction
The 327s were designed to meet changing missions of the service as it emerged from the Prohibition era. Because the air passenger trade was expanding both at home and overseas, the Coast Guard believed that cutter-based aircraft would be essential for future high-seas search and rescue. Also, during the mid-1930s, narcotics smuggling, mostly opium, was on the increase, and long-legged, fairly fast cutters were needed to curtail it. The Treasury class were an attempt to develop a  cutter capable of carrying an airplane in a hangar.

The final  design was based on the Erie-class US Navy gunboats; the machinery plant and hull below the waterline were identical. This standardization would save money—always paramount in the Coast Guard's mind, as the cutters were built in U.S. Navy shipbuilding yards. Thirty-two preliminary designs based upon the Erie class were drawn up before one was finally selected. The healthy sheer forward and the high slope in the deck in the wardrooms was known as the "Hunnewell Hump."  Commander (Constructor) F. G. Hunnewell, USCG, was the head of the Construction and Repair Department at that time.

The seven Treasury-class Coast Guard Cutters were:
, (original # 71) launched 14 January 1937
, (original # 65) launched 3 June 1936
, (original # 67) launched 3 June 1936
, (original # 69) launched 10 November 1936
USCGC Ingham (WPG-35), (original # 66) launched 3 June 1936
, (original # 70) launched 6 January 1937
USCGC Taney (WPG-37), (original # 68) launched 3 June 1936

They had crews of between 120 and 230 depending on whether they were serving in peace or wartime. The ships were originally built with two open centerline 5"/51 caliber gun mounts forward, and carried either a single Grumman JF-2 Duck or Curtiss SOC-4 aft. Various arrangements of 3"/50 and 5"/51 guns and depth charge throwers were installed aft when the planes were removed in 1940–41. Postwar armament typically included hedgehog and an enclosed 5"/38 caliber gun mount forward and MK 32 torpedo tube systems tubes aft.

World War II service
The 327s were also known for their high "Kill Rate" during World War II. Campbell demonstrated Treasury-class anti-submarine warfare suitability escorting convoy HX 159 in November 1941.  With a kill rate of 0.57 per ship, the Treasury class were the most successful anti-submarine warships. (US Navy Destroyer Escorts had a kill rate of 0.1) Treasury-class cutters served as leaders of Mid-Ocean Escort Force group A3 during the winter of 1942–43.
 Ingham escorted westbound convoy ONS 92.
 Campbell and Ingham escorted eastbound HX 190.
 Campbell, Ingham and Duane escorted westbound ONS 102.
 Spencer escorted eastbound SC 95 and westbound ON 125.
 Campbell and Spencer escorted eastbound SC 100 and westbound ON 135.
 Campbell escorted eastbound HX 212 and westbound ON 145.
 Spencer escorted eastbound SC 111 and westbound ONS 156.
 Campbell and Spencer escorted eastbound HX 223 and westbound Convoy ON 166.
 Spencer escorted eastbound Convoy SC 121 and westbound ON 175.
 Spencer and Duane escorted the final A3 convoy HX 233 eastbound.
Bibb and Ingham participated in the battles of Convoy SC 118 and Convoy SC 121. 
  
Taney served in the Pacific and was uniquely armed with four enclosed 5"/38 gun mounts in centerline positions where the Erie-class gunboats mounted 6"/47 guns.  The six surviving cutters were converted to amphibious force flagships towards the end of World War II. Taney also has the distinction of being one of only two military vessels still afloat that was present during the Pearl Harbor attack, 7 December 1941.

Fate

Bibb and Duane were sunk as artificial reefs off the coast of Florida in 1987. Campbell was sunk by the US Navy in a training exercise on 29 November 1984. Spencer was sold 8 October 1981 for scrap. Taney is currently a museum ship at the Baltimore Maritime Museum, in Baltimore, Maryland, and Ingham is part of the Key West Maritime Museum in Key West, Florida.

References

Footnotes

Bibliography 

 
 
 
 
 
 
 

Patrol ship classes
High endurance cutters
Battle of the Atlantic
North Atlantic convoys of World War II